Emma Clara Idun Klingenström (born 21 February 1995) is a Swedish singer-songwriter. She started her music career in 2010 and 2015 after winning the Gotland region final of the music competition Musik Direkt.

Career
In 2010, Klingenström participated in the web wildcard contest of Melodifestivalen 2011 with the song "Mr Lonely Man" and made it among the top 100 entries. Klingenström won the Gotland region of the music competition Svensktoppen nästa, held by Sveriges Radio P4 with the song "It Makes Me Crazy" in 2012.

Klingenström participated in Melodifestivalen 2021 with the song "Behöver inte dig idag" which she co-wrote with Bobby Ljunggren and David Lindgren Zacharias, advancing to the Andra chansen round. She then made it to the final held on 13 March . In the Swedish final she finished in fifth place.

On 13 August 2021, Clara released her new personal single 'Liv' one year after her father's death. The song reached 18th place on ITunes Charts.

In 2021, Clara won the Swedish music award Rockbjörnen.

Discography

Studio albums
 Claras dagbok (2021)

Singles

Notes

References

Living people
1995 births
21st-century Swedish  women singers
Swedish songwriters
Swedish-language singers
Melodifestivalen contestants of 2021